Keidane McAlpine (born January 12, 1975) is an American college soccer coach and the current head coach of the Georgia Bulldogs women's soccer team. McAlpine was the previous head coach of USC Trojans women's soccer team who he led to a National Championship in 2016.

Coaching career
In July 2006, McAlpine was hired as an assistant coach at Auburn University. Later, in January of 2012, he was hired to be the head coach at Washington State. He was then hired to be the head coach at USC in December 2013. In July 2016, McAlpine signed a contract extension at USC. McAlpine led the Trojans to a national championship in 2016.

In November 2021, McAlpine was hired as coach at Georgia.

College head coaching record

References

External links
USC bio

1975 births
Living people
American soccer players
American soccer coaches
American women's soccer coaches
Auburn Tigers women's soccer coaches
Birmingham–Southern Panthers women's soccer coaches
USC Trojans women's soccer coaches
Washington State Cougars women's soccer coaches
Birmingham–Southern Panthers men's soccer players
Association footballers not categorized by position
Georgia Bulldogs women's soccer coaches